National Highway 327A, commonly called NH 327A is a national highway in  India. It is a spur road of National Highway 27. NH-327A traverses the state of Bihar in India.

Route 
Supaul - Bhaptiahi.

Junctions  
 
  Terminal near Supaul.
  Terminal near Bhaptiahi.

See also 
 List of National Highways in India
 List of National Highways in India by state

References

External links 

 NH 327A on OpenStreetMap

National highways in India
National Highways in Bihar